The A1 motorway is the longest motorway in Croatia, spanning . As it connects the nation's capital Zagreb to the second largest city Split, the motorway represents a major north–south transportation corridor in Croatia and a significant part of the Adriatic–Ionian motorway. Apart from Zagreb and Split, the A1 motorway runs near a number of major Croatian cities, provides access to several national parks or nature parks, world heritage sites, and numerous resorts, especially along the Adriatic Coast. National significance of the motorway is reflected through its positive economic impact on the cities and towns it connects as well as its importance to tourism in Croatia.

The motorway consists of two traffic lanes and an emergency lane in each driving direction separated by a central reservation. All intersections of the A1 motorway are grade separated. There are 33 exits and 26 rest areas operating along the route. As the motorway is tolled using a ticket system and vehicle classification in Croatia, each exit includes a toll plaza.

A motorway connecting Zagreb and Split was designed in the early 1970s, and a public loan was started in order to collect sufficient funds for its construction. However, due to political upheavals in Croatia and Yugoslavia, construction of the motorway was labeled a "nationalist project" and cancelled in 1971. After Croatian independence and the conclusion of the Croatian War of Independence, efforts to build the motorway were renewed and construction started in 2000. The Zagreb–Split section of the route was completed by 2005, while the first sections between Split and Dubrovnik opened in 2007 and 2008. Construction costs incurred so far amount to 3 billion euro. The figure includes funds approved for construction work scheduled to be completed by 2013. On the other hand, the amount does not include construction cost related to Lučko–Bosiljevo 2 section since that section was funded as a part of Rijeka–Zagreb motorway construction project through Autocesta Rijeka–Zagreb, current operator of that sector. The remainder of the A1 motorway, i.e., the sections south of the Bosiljevo 2 interchange are operated by Hrvatske autoceste.

Route description 

The A1 motorway is a major north–south motorway in Croatia connecting the capital of the country, Zagreb, to the Dalmatia region, where the motorway follows a route parallel to the Adriatic coast. As a part of the road network of Croatia, it is a part of two major European routes: E65 Prague–Bratislava–Zagreb–Rijeka–Split–Dubrovnik and E71 Budapest–Zagreb–Karlovac–Bihać–Knin–Split. The motorway is of major importance to Croatia in terms of development of the economy; especially tourism and as a transit transport route. This has been reflected by an accelerated development of regions connected by the A1 motorway. A part of the motorway is considered to be a segment of the Adriatic–Ionian motorway. Once the latter motorway's connecting sections are completed, those currently spanned just by the Adriatic Highway as well as two-lane roads in Slovenia and Albania, the A1 will achieve genuine importance as a transit route.

The motorway spans  between Zagreb (Lučko interchange) and Ploče via Split. The route serves Karlovac via D1, Gospić via D534, Zadar via D8 and D424 and Šibenik via D533. The A1 motorway consists of two traffic lanes and an emergency lane in each driving direction along its entire length. The sole exception is Drežnik Viaduct where there are no emergency lanes. Almost all of the existing interchanges are trumpet interchanges, except for Lučko which is a stack. There are numerous rest areas along the motorway, providing various types of services ranging from simple parking spaces and restrooms to petrol stations, restaurants and hotels. , the motorway has 33 interchanges, providing access to numerous towns and cities and the Croatian state road network. The ultimate southern terminus of the motorway has been established to be near Dubrovnik.

Between the Lučko and Bosiljevo 2 interchanges, the motorway follows Pan-European corridor Vb, and is concurrent with the Zagreb–Rijeka motorway. The Bosiljevo 2 interchange distributes southbound A1 traffic flowing to Rijeka (via the A6 motorway) and to Split. That  segment of the motorway is operated by Autocesta Rijeka–Zagreb, while the remainder of the motorway is operated by Hrvatske autoceste.

An automatic traffic monitoring and guidance system is in place along the motorway. It consists of measuring, control and signaling devices, located in zones where driving conditions may vary—at interchanges, near viaducts, bridges, tunnels, and in zones where fog and strong wind are known to occur. The system comprises variable traffic signs used to communicate changing driving conditions, possible restrictions and other information to motorway users.

It serves, either directly or via connecting roads, a large number of tourist destinations such as Bjelolasica in Gorski Kotar, a large number of Adriatic Sea resorts and several national parks and nature parks. In Lika region those are Plitvice Lakes National Park, Sjeverni Velebit National Park and Velebit Nature Park, while in Dalmatia the motorway serves Paklenica National Park, Telašćica Nature Park, Kornati National Park, Lake Vrana Nature Park, Krka National Park and Biokovo Nature Park. The route also provides links to a number of UNESCO World Heritage Sites such as Plitvice Lakes, Šibenik Cathedral of St James, Palace of Diocletian in Split and the Historic City of Trogir.

Toll 

The A1 is a tolled motorway based on the vehicle classification in Croatia using a closed toll system integrated with the A6 motorway as the two connect in the Bosiljevo 2 interchange forming a unified toll system. Since the two motorways are operated by Autocesta Rijeka — Zagreb and Hrvatske autoceste, the toll collection system is operated jointly by the two operators. The toll is payable in Croatian kuna, euro, major credit and debit cards and using a number of prepaid toll collection systems including various types of smart cards issued by the motorway operators and ENC – an electronic toll collection (ETC) which is shared at all motorways in Croatia (except the A2 motorway) and provides drivers use of dedicated lanes at toll plazas and a discounted toll rates.

The A1 north of the Bosiljevo 2 interchange is operated by Autocesta Rijeka — Zagreb and the rest is operated by Hrvatske autoceste, both of which do not report company toll income separately for individual sections of various motorways. Total toll income reported by Hrvatske autoceste in the first half of 2011 was 508.1 million kuna (68.3 million euro). This figure pertains to the A1 south of the Bosiljevo 2 interchange as well as all other motorways operated by Hrvatske autoceste, however the A1 represents the longest and the busiest tolled motorway operated by Hrvatske autoceste. Toll income reported by Autocesta Rijeka — Zagreb for the first half of 2011 is 191.2 million kuna (25.7 million euro). This sum includes company toll income generated elsewhere, however the A1 section represents the busiest section of the motorway network operated by Autocesta Rijeka — Zagreb. Hrvatske autoceste and Autocesta Rijeka — Zagreb reported increase of the toll income compared to the same period of 2010 of 2.2% and 5% respectively.

Summertime and holiday queues at Lučko mainline toll plaza can be considerable, a problem exacerbated during the usual weekend-to-weekend tourist stays at Croatia's coastal resorts. In 2009, in an effort to address the problem, the Lučko mainline toll plaza was expanded to 15 lanes, and a single additional 10-lane toll plaza was built for fast cashless toll collection in Demerje. The Demerje toll plaza is available via a motorway fork accessible to the A1 northbound traffic only. Vehicles using the Demerje toll plaza default to the original motorway route immediately past the Lučko mainline toll plaza, between the plaza and the Lučko interchange. The faster cashless system has raised the nominal capacity of the road from 2,325 to 11,150 vehicles per hour. As of September 2010 northbound traffic leaving the A1 must exit the tolled motorway network, since the existing Zagreb bypass is not tolled, and then re-enter another tolled motorway. There are plans for the outer Zagreb bypass to be integrated into the tolled motorway network, as the ultimate solution for congestion at the Lučko toll plaza. That will require construction of a Horvati interchange south of the Lučko toll plaza.

Notable structures 

A total of 361 structures—bridges, viaducts, flyovers, underpasses, passages, wildlife crossings, and tunnels—have been completed on the motorway between Zagreb and Vrgorac, and calculations indicate that 18.6 percent of the route between Zagreb and Split is located on those structures, which is a quite considerable percentage for a motorway of this length. By June 2011, Ravča-Vrgorac section was completed, including 5 viaducts, 4 flyovers and a tunnel. An additional 15 structures were built on the section between Vrgorac and Ploče, plus on the connection towards the city of Ploče.

The Mala Kapela and Sveti Rok tunnels are not only the largest individual structures on the motorway but they are also the longest tunnels in Croatia. The tunnels separate three distinct climate zones. The Mala Kapela Tunnel spans between the continental climate of the central Croatia and the mountain climate of Lika, while the Sveti Rok Tunnel provides a link between Lika and its mountain climate and the Mediterranean climate of Dalmatia. Both of the Mala Kapela and Sveti Rok tunnels were originally operated as single tubes when they were opened for traffic in June 2005 until 30 May 2009, when the second tubes of the tunnels were also opened for traffic.

, there are six other major viaducts completed on the route–— the Kotezi Viaduct, Modruš 1, Mokro Polje, Jezerane, Srijane and Rašćane viaducts. A dispute concerning naming of the Viaduct arose one month prior to opening of the motorway section containing the viaduct, and the structure was even signposted as the Bunina Viaduct for several days in June 2011, only to revert the name to the Kotezi Viaduct days prior to the opening ceremony itself.

History

The A1 motorway was originally designed in the early 1970s, albeit along a different route than the present Zagreb–Split motorway route. After suppression of the Croatian Spring and removal of the Croatian leadership that proposed and adopted the construction plan in 1971, all the work related to the Zagreb–Split motorway was cancelled. The plans were revived in the 1990s and new designs were developed to include a motorway section built between Zagreb and Karlovac into the design so that the section could be shared between Zagreb–Split and Zagreb–Rijeka motorways. Construction work started in 2000 and the motorway reached Split by 2005 and was extended towards Dubrovnik later on. Both in the 1970s and in the 2000s, construction of the Zagreb–Split motorway was perceived to symbolize rebuilding of national unity.

King Tomislav Motorway

The Zagreb–Split motorway, now the A1 motorway, was one of three routes defined by the Parliament of the Socialist Republic of Croatia on 5 March 1971, as priority transport routes of Croatia that were to be developed as motorways. Originally the motorway was designed to follow a route from Zagreb to Bihać (Bosnia and Herzegovina) and then to Split via Knin. The government of Bosnia and Herzegovina issued its approval for the route in Bihać region in the same year. Construction of the motorway was initiated by a fundraising effort — a public loan.

Further construction of motorways from Zagreb to Rijeka and Split was suspended for the next 28 years following a political decision of the Croatian leadership, newly installed during Yugoslav suppression of the Croatian Spring, to "stop megalomaniac projects". It is considered that the true reason for the cancellation of the works was that the motorway was considered to be a "nationalist" project. The conclusion is supported by the fact the road was spontaneously nicknamed King Tomislav Motorway by citizens investing their money through the public loan after the first king of medieval Croatia, who united Croatia as a single kingdom in 925. The funds raised through the public loan were left unused for several months, then spent for construction of a road between Vrlika and Strmica via Knin, now a part of the D1 and D30 state roads. However, the United Nations Economic Commission for Europe recognized the route as the southernmost part of the Pyhrn route, giving it the designation E59 in 1975. Subsequent reorganizations of the E-road network, including the latest one in 2008, transferred the route south of Zagreb to the E71.

Dalmatina

In the beginning of the 1990s, construction of the motorway was further postponed because of onset of the Croatian War of Independence. The decade saw renewed discussion regarding construction of the motorway, including renewed considerations of its route. Soon, the originally devised route running through Bihać was set aside and two new routes were considered: One of them was a modified version of the original route, bypassing Bihać and running through the Plitvice Lakes region while the other was a completely new route further to the west via Gospić and Zadar, which was eventually accepted for construction. Both of the alternative routes proposed that the Zagreb–Karlovac motorway already completed in 1972 were to be used as the northernmost section of the Zagreb–Split and Zagreb–Rijeka motorways.

The A1 was a showpiece project of the Croatian government and a symbol of uniting the country. The first attempt to revive the project in earnest occurred in the 1993, when the excavation of Sveti Rok Tunnel began. More comprehensive construction work started in 2000 and Karlovac–Vukova Gorica section opened in 2001. In 2003, the first sections not shared with the Zagreb–Rijeka Motorway were completed: Vukova Gorica–Mala Kapela Tunnel and Gornja Ploča–Zadar 2. Mala Kapela Tunnel–Gornja Ploča, Zadar 2–Pirovac and Vrpolje–Dugopolje sections opened in 2004 and Mala Kapela Tunnel itself and Pirovac–Vrpolje section opened in 2005 marking completion of the Zagreb–Split Motorway, culminating with the grand opening of Karlovac — Split section on 26 June 2005.

Construction of the motorway along its Split–Dubrovnik sector started once the motorway sectors north of Split were complete, and the section between Split (Dugopolje interchange) and Šestanovac interchange opened on 27 June 2007. The last sections to be completed to date are Šestanovac–Ravča, opened on 22 December 2008, Ravča-Vrgorac section opened on 30 June 2011, and the Vrgorac-Ploče section opened on 20 December 2013. In the 2000s, as the motorway construction works were gradually progressing further south, the motorway earned its unofficial, yet widely used name—Dalmatina in Croatian press because it connected Zagreb to Dalmatia. In 2010, Donja Zdenčina interchange was opened between Lučko and Jastrebarsko interchanges, and in June 2012, Novigrad interchange opened bringing number of motorway exits to 33.

Construction cost

Construction cost incurred on the Dugopolje–Ploče sector of the motorway between 2005 and 2008 was reported at 4.1 billion kuna and additional 1.8 billion kuna of construction expenses are planned until the end of 2012 (representing approximately 560 and 245 million euro, respectively). The latter figure includes construction of the D425 state road but it does not include full completion of the Vrgorac–Ploče section.

Further construction 
The ultimate southern terminus of the motorway has been established by applicable legislation to be near Dubrovnik.

Hrvatske autoceste, operator of the southern portion of the A1 motorway, ordered the execution of design documents, feasibility and environmental impact studies for the Doli – Osojnik section of the motorway that is to be constructed near Dubrovnik. Commencement of construction on this section was originally scheduled for 2009. Despite an official ceremony to mark commencement of construction works on the section, no works beyond design and study development has been carried out there.

The A1 motorway route between Ploče and Doli has not been fixed yet, as several options exist, all of which require the route to cross either an embayment of the Adriatic Sea or a part of the territory of Bosnia and Herzegovina. While the construction of the Pelješac Bridge, spanning the coast south of Ploče and the Pelješac peninsula, had been associated with A1, its design includes only one traffic lane in each direction unlike the A1 motorway standard of two.

In April 2012, government of Bosnia-Herzegovina proposed a route in Neum area to connect Ploče and Dubrovnik while serving Neum.

A planned modification of the existing route encompasses construction of a directional T interchange to replace the existing trumpet interchange built at Žuta Lokva. The new interchange is only planned to be built once the A7 motorway is completed between the Rijeka bypass and Žuta Lokva. It shall not feature any weaving, similar to the Bosiljevo 2 interchange of the A1 and A6 motorways.

Traffic volume 
Traffic is regularly counted by means of traffic census at toll stations and reported by Autocesta Rijeka–Zagreb and Hrvatske autoceste—the operators of the northern and the southern portions of the motorway respectively. The reported traffic volume gradually decreases as the motorway chainage increases and as it passes by various major destinations and the interchanges that serve them. Thus the greatest volume of traffic is registered between Jastrebarsko and Lučko interchanges – with 31,432 vehicle annual average daily traffic (AADT), and 53,216 vehicle average summer daily traffic (ASDT) figures as that is the section closest to Zagreb. South of the Bosiljevo 2 interchange the first major drop of traffic volume is recorded on the A1 motorway, due to traffic transferring to the A6 motorway towards Rijeka. Other similar changes of the traffic volume are registered near Zadar (served by Zadar 1 and Zadar 2 interchanges) and Split served by Dugopolje interchange. Substantial variations observed between AADT and ASDT are normally attributed to the fact that the motorway carries significant tourist traffic. The seasonal increase traffic volume variations ranges 69% on the busiest, Lučko–Jastrebarsko section to 160% as measured on Sveti Rok–Maslenica section. The summer season traffic volume increase on the motorway is 120%.

Rest areas 

As of September 2010, there are 26 rest areas operating along the A1 motorway, and additional rest areas are planned along the existing sections of the route and those sections under construction. Legislation provides for four types of rest areas designated as types A through D—A-type rest areas comprise a full range of amenities including a filling station, a restaurant and a hotel or a motel; B-type rest areas have no lodging; C-type rest areas are very common and include a filling station and a café, but no restaurants or accommodation; D-type rest areas offer parking spaces only, possibly some picnicking tables and benches and restrooms. Even though the rest areas found along the A1 motorway generally follow this ranking system, there are considerable variations as some of them offer extra services. The most notable example is Krka rest area—even though it has no filling station, there is, for instance, a restaurant available. The filling stations regularly have small convenience stores and some of them offer LPG fuel. EuroTest, an international association of 18 European automobile clubs spearheaded by German automobile club ADAC, surveyed three of the A1 motorway rest areas in 2009: Krka, Lički Osik and Modruš (in case of the latter, both eastbound and westbound). All of the rest areas were rated as very good, especially in terms of facilities offered.

The primary motorway operators Hrvatske autoceste (HAC) and Autocesta Rijeka – Zagreb lease the A, B and C type rest areas to various operators through public tenders. As of September 2010, there are five such rest area operators on the A1 motorway: INA, OMV, Tifon, Petrol and Crobenz. The rest area operators are not permitted to sub-lease the fuel operations; Tifon and Petrol operated rest areas have restaurants or hotels operated by Marché, a Mövenpick Hotels & Resorts subsidiary. All of the A1 motorway rest areas, except Stupnik and Jezerane, are accessible to both directions of the motorway traffic. The rest areas normally operate 24 hours a day, 7 days a week.

{| class="wikitable"
|+ List of A1 motorway rest areas
|-
!scope="col"|County
!scope="col"|km
!scope="col"|Name
!scope="col"|Operators
!scope="col"|Notes
|-
| City of Zagreb
| style="background:#fdd;"|1.1
| style="background:#fdd;"|Stupnik
| style="background:#fdd;"|Crodux
| style="background:#fdd;"|Facilities found at Stupnik rest area comprise a filling station selling petrol, diesel fuel and LPG, a café and restrooms.Accessible to the southbound traffic only
|-
| Zagreb County
| 16.9
| Desinec
| PetrolMarché
| Facilities found at Desinec rest area comprise a filling station selling petrol, diesel fuel and LPG, a restaurant, a motel, an ATM and restrooms. The motel is operated by Marché.
|-
| rowspan=4|Karlovac
| 33.6
| Draganić
| TifonMarché
| Facilities found at Desinec rest area comprise a filling station selling petrol, diesel fuel and LPG, a restaurant, a hotel and restrooms. The hotel and the restaurant are operated by Marché and are accessible to the southbound traffic only.
|-
|
| 
| INA
| Facilities found at Vukova Gorica rest area comprise a filling station selling petrol, diesel fuel and LPG, a restaurant, a motel and restrooms.
|-
| 78.4
| Dobra
| TifonMarché
| Facilities found at Dobra rest area comprise a filling station selling petrol, diesel fuel and LPG, a restaurant, an ATM, showers and restrooms. The hotel and the restaurant are operated by Marché.
|-
| 100.6
| Modruš
| HAC
| Facilities found at Modruš rest area comprise picnicking tables and restrooms.
|-
| rowspan=8 |Lika-Senj
| style="background:#fdd;"|109.2
| style="background:#fdd;"|Jezerane
| style="background:#fdd;"|HAC
| style="background:#fdd;"|Facilities found at Jezerane rest area comprise picnicking tables and restrooms.Accessible to the southbound traffic only
|-
| 119.0
| Brinje
| INA
| Facilities found at Brinje rest area comprise a filling station selling petrol and diesel fuel, a café and restrooms.
|-
| 134.1
| 
| HAC
| Parking area only
|-
| 152.9
| 
| HAC
| Parking area only
|-
| 159.8
| Janjče
| Crodux
| Facilities found at Janjče rest area comprise a filling station selling petrol and diesel fuel, a restaurant, a café and restrooms.
|-
| 175.0
| 
| HAC
| Facilities found at Lički Osik rest area comprise picnicking tables and restrooms.
|-
| 191.5
| Jadova
| HAC
| Parking area only
|-
| 201.1
| Zir
| INAMacola
| Facilities found at Zir rest area comprise a filling station selling petrol, diesel fuel and LPG, a café and restrooms. The facilities additionally available to the southbound traffic only are a restaurant and a motel.
|-
| rowspan=4 |Zadar
| 227.9
| Marune
| HAC
| Parking area only. Other facilities at Marune rest area like the hotel, café, convenience store, picnicking tables and restrooms are closed.
|-
| 239.4
| Jasenice
| TifonMarché
| Facilities found at Desinec rest area comprise a filling station selling petrol, diesel fuel and LPG, a restaurant, showers and restrooms. The restaurant is operated by Marché.
|-
| 271.0
| Nadin
| Crodux
| Facilities found at Nadin rest area comprise a filling station selling petrol and diesel fuel, a restaurant, a café and restrooms.
|-
| 292.0
| Pristeg
| HAC
| Parking area only
|-
| rowspan=3 |Šibenik-Knin
| 306.6
| Prokljan
| INA
| Facilities found at Prokljan rest area comprise a filling station selling petrol and diesel fuel, a café and restrooms.
|-
| 315.0
| Krka
| HAC
| Facilities found at Krka rest area comprise an a la carte restaurant, a café, a convenience store, picnicking tables and restrooms.
|-
| 332.0
| Vrpolje
| Crobenz
| Facilities found at Vrpolje rest area comprise a filling station selling petrol and diesel fuel, a restaurant, a café, an ATM and restrooms.
|-
| rowspan=5 |Split-Dalmatia
| 343.5
| Sitno
| HAC
| Parking area only
|-
| 356.3
| Radošić
| HAC
| Parking area only; Accessible to both southbound and northbound traffic
|-
| 369.6
| Kozjak
| INA
| Facilities found at Kozjak rest area comprise a filling station selling petrol, diesel fuel and LPG, a café and restrooms.
|-
| 392.6
| Mosor
| Petrol
| Facilities found at Mosor rest area comprise a filling station selling petrol and diesel fuel, a café and restrooms.
|-
|
| 
| HAC
| Facilities found at Rašćane Gornje rest area comprise parking areas and restrooms only.

Exit list 

{| class="wikitable"
|-  
!scope="col"|County
!scope="col"|km
!scope="col"|Exit
!scope="col"|Name
!scope="col"|Destination
!scope="col"|Notes
|-
| rowspan=4|City of Zagreb
| style="background:#dfd;"|0.0
|  style="background:#dfd; text-align:center;"| 1
| style="background:#dfd;" | Lučko
| style="background:#dfd;"|
| style="background:#dfd;"|Access to the A3 motorway – Zagreb bypass (E70), the A2 and A4 motorways and the city of Zagreb itself via Jadranska Avenue (Ž1040); Northbound A1 traffic defaults to six-lane Jadranska Avenue (Ž1040)The northern terminus of European routes E65/E71 concurrency.
|-
| 0.6
| align=center |
| colspan=2|Lučko toll plaza
| Lučko mainline toll plaza, serving both southbound and northbound traffic; The plaza accepts cash only, while drivers using ETC or credit/debit card payment methods must exit the motorway via Demerje toll plaza.
|-
| style="background:#fdd;"|1.1
|  style="background:#fdd; text-align:center;"|
| style="background:#fdd;" colspan="2"|Stupnik rest area
| style="background:#fdd;"|Accessible to the southbound traffic only
|-
| style="background:#fdd;"|3.6
|  style="background:#fdd; text-align:center;"|
| style="background:#fdd;" colspan="2"|Demerje toll plaza
| style="background:#fdd;"|Demerje mainline toll plaza access fork, accessible to northbound traffic only; The plaza accepts cashless payments only, while drivers using cash payment methods must exit the motorway via Lučko toll plaza. The traffic using this exit proceeds north along a three lane access road parallel to the main A1 route and rejoins it immediately to the north of Lučko toll plaza.
|-
| rowspan=3|Zagreb County
| 14.2
| align=center | 1a
| 
| 
| Connection to Klinča SelaThe D36 state road is planned to be rerouted to this interchange.
|-
| 16.9
| align=center |
| colspan= 3 |Desinec rest area
|-
| 20.0
| align=center | 2
| |Jastrebarsko
| 
| Trumpet interchange providing access to Jastrebarsko
|-
| rowspan=13|Karlovac
| 33.6
| align=center |
| colspan= 3 |Draganić
|-
| style="background:#dfd;"|38.6
|  style="background:#dfd; text-align:center;"| 3
| style="background:#dfd;"|Karlovac
| style="background:#dfd;"| 
| style="background:#dfd;"|Access to Karlovac via the D1/D3 (E71 concurrent at the junction); Access to Plitvice Lakes National Park.An at-grade intersection is located just outside the toll plaza providing access to the D36 state road.The southern terminus of the European route E71 concurrency.
|-
|
| colspan="4" style="text-align:center;"|Drežnik Viaduct
|-
|
| colspan="4" style="text-align:center;"|Dobra Bridge
|-
| 50.0
| align=center| 4
| Novigrad
| 
| Access to Netretić and Jurovski Brod border crossing to Slovenia
|-
| 62.9
| align=center | 5
| Bosiljevo 1
| 
| Access to Bosiljevo, Bosanci (D3) and Pribanjci border crossing to Slovenia
|-
|
| align=center |
| colspan= 3 |Vukova Gorica rest area
|-
| style="background:#dfd;"|66.8
|  style="background:#dfd; text-align:center;"| 6
| style="background:#dfd;"|Bosiljevo 2
| style="background:#dfd;"| 
| style="background:#dfd;"|Limited access trumpet interchange, providing access to the A6 motorway (E65) to RijekaThe first intermediate terminus of the European route E65 concurrency—the route north of this interchange is concurrent with the E65.
|-
| 78.4
| align=center |
| colspan= 3 |Dobra rest area
|-
| 86.8
| align=center | 7
| Ogulin
| 
| Connection to Ogulin, Oštarije and Josipdol, Klek Mountain and Bjelolasica sports centre
|-
|
| colspan="4" style="text-align:center;"|Miljanica Bridge
|-
|
| colspan="4" style="text-align:center;"|Modruš 1 Viaduct
|-
| 100.6
| align=center |
| colspan= 3 |Modruš rest area
|-
| Karlovac /Lika-Senj
|
| colspan="4" style="text-align:center;"|Mala Kapela Tunnel
|-
| rowspan=21 |Lika-Senj
| style="background:#fdd;"|109.2
|  style="background:#fdd; text-align:center;"|
| style="background:#fdd;" colspan="2"|Jezerane rest area
| style="background:#fdd;"|Accessible to the southbound traffic only
|-
|
| colspan="4" style="text-align:center;"|Mokro Polje Viaduct
|-
|
| colspan="4" style="text-align:center;"|Jezerane Viaduct
|-
| 115.2
| align=center | 8
| Brinje
| 
| Connection to Brinje and Križpolje
|-
| 119.0
| align=center |
| colspan= 3 |Brinje rest area
|-
|
| colspan="4" style="text-align:center;"|Brinje Tunnel
|-
| style="background:#dfd;"|124.9
| style="background:#dfd;" align=center | 9
| style="background:#dfd;" nowrap=yes|Žuta Lokva
| style="background:#dfd;"|
| style="background:#dfd;"|A very short stretch of the A7 is in place at this interchange. Provides connection to Senj, the D8 state road and island of Rab (to the west).
|-
| 134.1
| align=center |
| colspan= 3 |Brloška Dubrava rest area
|-
| 137.8
| align=center | 10
| Otočac
| 
| Connection to Otočac, Plitvice Lakes National Park, Sjeverni Velebit National Park and Velebit Nature Park
|-
|
| colspan="4" style="text-align:center;"|Gacka Bridge
|-
|
| colspan="4" style="text-align:center;"|Plasina Tunnel
|-
|
| colspan="4" style="text-align:center;"|Grič Tunnel
|-
| 152.9
| align=center |
| colspan= 3 | Ličko Lešće rest area
|-
| 159.8
| align=center |
| colspan= 3 |Janjče rest area
|-
| 169.7
| align=center | 11
| Perušić
| 
| Connection to Perušić (D50)
|-
| 175.0
| align=center |
| colspan= 3 |Lički Osik rest area
|-
| 181.0
| align=center | 12
| Gospić
| 
| Provides access to Gospić, Lički Osik, Karlobag and Korenica via the D25 and D50 state roads
|-
| 191.5
| align=center |
| colspan= 3 |Jadova rest area
|-
| 201.1
| align=center |
| colspan= 3 |Zir rest area
|-
| 204.0
| align=center | 13
| 
| 
| Connection to Udbina (D1) and Plitvice Lakes National Park
|-
| 209.6
| align=center | 14
| Sveti Rok
| 
| Connection to Gračac and Medak
|-
| Lika-Senj / Zadar
|
| colspan="4" style="text-align:center;"|Sveti Rok Tunnel
|-
| rowspan=10 |Zadar
| 227.9
| align=center |
| colspan= 3 |Marune rest area
|-
| 239.4
| align=center |
| colspan= 3 |Jasenice rest area
|-
| 242.4
| align=center| 15
| Rovanjska
| 
| Connection to Starigrad, Karlobag, Posedarje, Obrovac and Paklenica National Park
|-
|
| colspan="4" style="text-align:center;"|Maslenica Bridge
|-
| 249.6
| align=center | 16
| Posedarje
| 
| Connection to Pag Island and Posedarje (D8)
|-
| 253.4
| align=center | 17
| Zadar 1
| 
| Access to Zadar (north) via Zagrebačka street; also serving Nin, Vir and Pag
|-
| 262.4
| align=center | 18
| Zadar 2
| 
| Connection to Zadar (south), Zadar Airport and Port of Zadar (Gaženica); Also serving Ugljan, Pašman, Žut, Dugi otok, Telašćica Nature Park and Sukošan
|-
| 271.0
| align=center |
| colspan= 3 |Nadin rest area
|-
| 278.7
| align=center | 19
| Benkovac
| 
| Connection to Biograd na moru, Benkovac, Kornati National Park, Lake Vrana Nature Park, Sveti Filip i Jakov and Pakoštane; A motorway interchange connector road links both to the D27 and D503 roads.
|-
| 292.0
| align=center |
| colspan= 3 |Pristeg rest area
|-
| rowspan=9 |Šibenik-Knin
| 300.1
| align=center | 20
| Pirovac
| 
| Connection to Vodice, Kornati National Park, Pirovac and Murter Island
|-
| 306.6
| align=center |
| colspan= 3 |Prokljan rest area
|-
| 310.1
| align=center | 21
| Skradin
| 
| Connection to Krka National Park, Skradin, Visovac Island and to Piramatovci (D59) to the north
|-
|
| colspan="4" style="text-align:center;"|Krka Bridge
|-
| 315.0
| align=center |
| colspan= 3 |Krka rest area
|-
| 319.1
| align=center | 22
| Šibenik
| 
| A connection to Šibenik (D8) to the south and Drniš and Knin to the north; Also serving Prvić, Zlarin, Žirje, Kaprije and Obonjan islands
|-
|
| colspan="4" style="text-align:center;"|Dabar Bridge
|-
| 332.0
| align=center |
| colspan= 3 |Vrpolje rest area
|-
| 333.7
| align=center | 23
| Vrpolje
| 
| Connection to Primošten and Perković
|-
| rowspan=20 |Split-Dalmatia
| 343.5
| align=center |
| colspan= 3 |Sitno rest area
|-
| 351.0
| align=center | 24
| Prgomet
| 
| Connection to D8 at Plano (via Ž6091) and D58 near Prapatnice; The former facilitates a western approach to Kaštela.
|-
| 356.3
| align=center |
| colspan= 3 |Radošić rest area
|-
| 364.7
| align=center | 24a
| Vučevica
| 
| Serving Vučevica
|-
| 369.6
| align=center |
| colspan= 3 |Kozjak rest area
|-
|
| colspan="4" style="text-align:center;"|Konjsko Tunnel
|-
| 378.4
| align=center | 25
| Dugopolje
| 
| The main entrance to Split, via the D1 (E71) executed as an expressway, provides access to Split city centre and the D8 state route
|-
| 390.2
| align=center | 26
| Bisko
| 
| Connection to Imotski (via D60), Trilj and Kamensko border crossing to Bosnia and Herzegovina
|-
|
| colspan="4" style="text-align:center;"|Srijane Viaduct
|-
| 392.6
| align=center |
| colspan= 3 |Mosor rest area
|-
| 403.5
| align=center | 27
| Blato na Cetini
| 
| Connection to Omiš (D8) and Blato na Cetini
|-
| 415.3
| align=center | 28
| Šestanovac
| 
| Connection to Brela (D8) to the south and to Cista Provo (D60) and Aržano to the north
|-
| 428.5
| align=center | 29
| Zagvozd
| 
| Connection to D62 state road and Zagvozd via Ž6179; connection to Baška Voda (D532 state road).
|-
|
| align=center |
| colspan= 3 |Rašćane Gornje rest area
|-
|
| colspan="4" style="text-align:center;"|Rašćane Viaduct
|-
| 455.3
| align=center | 30
| Ravča
| 
| Connection to Ravča (and Makarska via D512); Access to Biokovo Nature Park
|-
|
| colspan="4" style="text-align:center;"|Šare Viaduct
|-
|
| colspan="4" style="text-align:center;"|Kotezi Viaduct
|-
| 465.1
| style="text-align:center;"| 30a
| Vrgorac
| 
| Connection to Vrgorac and D62 road via Ž6208
|-
|
| colspan="4" style="text-align:center;"|Veliki Prolog Viaduct
|-
| Dubrovnik-Neretva
| style="background:#dfd;"|476.3
| style="background:#dfd; text-align:center;"| 31
| style="background:#dfd;"|Ploče interchange
| style="background:#dfd;"|
| style="background:#dfd;"|Connection to Ploče and Port of Ploče to the south via D425; Metković and the Bosnia and Herzegovina border crossing to the east via A10.Southern terminus of the E65 concurrency.A further extension of the motorway to Dubrovnik is planned.
|-

See also 

 International E-road network
 Transport in Croatia

Notes

References

External links 

Hrvatske autoceste Official Website

Motorways in Croatia
Roads in Zagreb
Zagreb County
Transport in Karlovac County
Lika-Senj County
Transport in Zadar County
Transport in Šibenik-Knin County
Transport in Split-Dalmatia County
Transport in Dubrovnik-Neretva County